The Roc Boys is a collaborative studio album by State Property members Beanie Sigel and Freeway. The album was released on March 9, 2010. The album features guest appearances from Young Chris, Young Gunz, State Property, Jakk Frost, Wale and Tyeena.

Background
Before the album's release, DMX was meant to make an appearance on the album but in the final recording he didn't appear on the album.  The album was meant to be released on February 23, 2010, but was pushed back to March 9, 2010. Various tracks on the album had been previously leaked on the internet before the album's release

Chart performance
The album charted on Billboards Top R&B album charts at number 53 and it also charted on the top rap albums at number 23.

Track listing

Charts

References

2010 albums
Beanie Sigel albums
Freeway (rapper) albums
Collaborative albums